Gretchen Demarest Driskell (born October 1, 1958) is an American politician, accountant, and real estate agent from the state of Michigan. A member of the Democratic Party, she served in the Michigan House of Representatives, representing the 52nd district. Before her time in the Michigan legislature, she was the first female mayor of Saline, Michigan, a position she held for 14 years.

Michigan House of Representatives

Elections
Driskell challenged Republican incumbent Mark Ouimet for the 52nd House district (northern and western suburban Washtenaw County areas outside Ann Arbor) in 2012. She defeated Ouimet, receiving 26,646 votes (52.9%) to his 23,609 (46.8%). In 2014, Driskell defeated Republican nominee John Hochstetler, receiving 20,849 votes (56.2%) to his 16,265 (43.8%).

U.S. House of Representatives elections

2016

In February 2015 Driskell announced that she would challenge Republican incumbent Tim Walberg for Michigan's 7th congressional district. In a March 2015 Inside Michigan Politics/Revsix/Change Media poll, Driskell led Walberg 42%-37% with 21% undecided. In a September 2015 Harper Polling poll, Walberg led Driskell 49%-32% with 20% undecided. Driskell was endorsed by former Republican governor William Milliken, who also endorsed Hillary Clinton.

In the general election, Driskell lost to Walberg, who received 55% of the vote to Driskell's 40%.

2018

In December 2017, Driskell announced she would run against Walberg again. She faced a challenge in the Democratic primary from Steve Friday, a progressive grassroots activist from Dexter. Driskell won the nomination easily. She lost to Walberg again, 54% to 46%.

References

External links 

Gretchen Driskell for Congress campaign website
Official House Democrats website (archived)

1958 births
21st-century American politicians
21st-century American women politicians
American accountants
Women accountants
American real estate brokers
Businesspeople from Michigan
George Washington University alumni
Living people
University of Lynchburg alumni
Mayors of places in Michigan
Democratic Party members of the Michigan House of Representatives
People from Saline, Michigan
Women in finance
Women mayors of places in Michigan
Women state legislators in Michigan
Candidates in the 2018 United States elections